The 2006 Nordea Nordic Light Open was a women's tennis tournament played on outdoor hard courts. It was the 4th edition of the Nordic Light Open, and was part of the Tier IV Series of the 2006 WTA Tour. It was the fifth edition of the tournament and took place at the Stockholm Olympic Stadium in Stockholm, Sweden, from 7 August until 13 August 2006. Third-seeded Zheng Jie won the singles title and earned $22,900 first-prize money.

Finals

Singles

 Zheng Jie defeated  Anastasia Myskina, 6–4, 6–1
 It was Jie's 2nd singles title of the year and the 3rd title of her career.

Doubles

 Eva Birnerová /  Jarmila Gajdošová defeated  Yan Zi /  Zheng Jie, 0–6, 6–4, 6–2

Prize money and ranking points

Prize money

* per team

Ranking points

Notes

References

External links
 ITF tournament edition details
 Tournament draws

Nordea Nordic Light Open
2006
2006 in Swedish women's sport
2000s in Stockholm
August 2006 sports events in Europe
Nordic